Athletes from the Socialist Federal Republic of Yugoslavia competed at the 1972 Winter Olympics in Sapporo, Japan.

Alpine skiing

Men

Men's slalom

Ice hockey

First round
Winners (in bold) entered the Medal Round. Other teams played a consolation round for 7th-11th places.

|}

Consolation Round

Norway 5-2 Yugoslavia
West Germany 6-2 Yugoslavia
Japan 3-2 Yugoslavia
Switzerland 3-3 Yugoslavia

Nordic combined 

Events:
 normal hill ski jumping (Three jumps, best two counted and shown here.)
 15 km cross-country skiing

Ski jumping

References 
 Official Olympic Reports
 International Olympic Committee results database
 Olympic Winter Games 1972, full results by sports-reference.com

Nations at the 1972 Winter Olympics
1972
Winter Olympics